"Uncle" Lionel Batiste (February 11, 1931 – July 8, 2012) was a jazz and blues musician and singer from New Orleans. He began his music career at the age of 11 playing bass drum with the Square Deal Social & Pleasure Club. He was the bass drummer, vocalist and assistant leader of the Treme Brass Band; known for his kazoo playing and singing as well, and has recorded a CD as a vocalist.

Besides inspiring younger musicians with his playing, he served as a role model to many of them: trumpeter Kermit Ruffins calls Batiste his "total influence," saying that Batiste "taught [him] how to act, how to dress, how to feel about life." Internationally, Batiste has served as leader of the daily Moldejazz parade since 2000. He was king of the Krewe du Vieux for 2003.

References

.
Matters of Great Importance: Uncle Batiste’s Stolen Drum. BestofNewOrleans.com, February 5, 2010.
 Gambit Weekly obit
 New Orleans Celebrates the Life of a Bandleader. New York Times, July 17, 2012.

External links
 Uncle Lionel Batiste, Treme Brass Band bass drummer, dies Keith Spera, Times-Picayune

Jazz musicians from New Orleans
American jazz drummers
American jazz singers
2012 deaths
Louisiana Creole people
1931 births
Singers from Louisiana